Rafael Herrera (born 7 January 1945) is a Mexican former professional boxer. He has won the Lineal championship in the bantamweight division.

Professional career
Herrera turned pro in 1963 and in 1972 defeated Rubén Olivares by TKO to capture the Lineal, WBC and WBA bantamweight titles. He lost the titles in his first defense to Enrique Pinder. Pinder was stripped of the WBC title after this fight for failure to defend against Rodolfo Martinez. Herrera fought Martinez for the vacant WBC bantamweight title the following year and won by TKO, a fight in which Martinez down four times (twice in 4th, twice in 11th), and Herrera was down in the 8th. He defended the title twice before losing it in 1974 in a rematch with Martinez. The outcome of the bout was controversial, as Herrera was on his feet at the count of 7 after being knocked down and was asked by the referee if he could continue. Herrera nodded "yes" but a split second later the referee raised Martinez' hand and declared him the winner. Herrera lurched forward but the referee contained him. The ensuing conversation between Herrera and the referee was heard on the national TV broadcast.

Professional boxing record

Personal life
Born into a large working-class family, Herrera originally wanted to be a priest. In 1971 he married Leticia, his longtime wife with whom he had two daughters.

See also
List of Mexican boxing world champions
List of world bantamweight boxing champions

References

External links

Rafael Herrera - CBZ Profile

 

|-

|-

|-

|-

1945 births
Living people
Boxers from Jalisco
Mexican male boxers
Bantamweight boxers
World bantamweight boxing champions
World Boxing Association champions
World Boxing Council champions
The Ring (magazine) champions